Thirayum Theeravum is a 1980 Indian Malayalam film,  directed by K. G. Rajasekharan. The film stars Prem Nazir, Jayabharathi, Aranmula Ponnamma and Jayaprabha in the lead roles. The film has musical score by G. Devarajan.

Cast
Prem Nazir as Adv. Premachandran
Jayabharathi as Savithri
Aranmula Ponnamma as Muthassi
Jayaprabha as Usha
M. G. Soman as Mohan
Ravikumar as Balagopal
Kaviyoor Ponnamma as Mohan's mother

Soundtrack
The music was composed by G. Devarajan and the lyrics were written by Yusufali Kechery.

References

1980 films
1980s Malayalam-language films
Films directed by K. G. Rajasekharan